Alf McDonald may refer to:

 Alf McDonald (American football), college football player
 Alf McDonald (ice hockey) (1877–1956), Canadian ice hockey player